The M1064 mortar carrier is an American vehicle, consisting of the M121 mortar – a version of the M120 mortar – mounted on an M113 chassis. The M1287 Mortar Carrier Vehicle will replace the M1064 in U.S. Army service.

Design 
The design consists of the M298 Cannon, M191 Bipod, M9 Baseplate, and the Carrier Adaptation Kit. With the use of an auxiliary M9 Baseplate and extension feet for the M191 Bipod, the M121 can be dismounted from the vehicle and emplaced for ground-mounted operations.
The first M1064s were converted from M106 mortar carriers, whose 107 mm mortars had been replaced by the 120 mm mortars.

Operators

Current operators
 : 36 M1064A3.
 : 12 M1064A3 ordered in 1995 and delivered in 1997.
 : 1076 M120/M1064A3 Israel

Gallery

See also 
 M1129 Mortar Carrier, U.S. Army mortar carrier based on Stryker
 XM1204 Non-Line-of-Sight Mortar, U.S. Army Future Combat Systems mortar carrier canceled in 2009

References

External links

See also 
 Variants of the M113 armored personnel carrier

Military vehicles of the United States
Tracked mortars
Military vehicles introduced in the 1990s